The Sturgis Commercial Block, on the south side of Main Street in Sturgis, South Dakota, is a row of buildings running from number 1000 to number 1028 Main St.  It is a historic district consisting of nine contributing buildings which was listed on the National Register of Historic Places in 1975.

Six of the buildings have front facades of cut stone;  two are two-story while the rest are one-story.  Buildings include:
1008 Main (built in 1898). This one-story cut stone building with three arched openings.
1012 Main (1899). One-story, cut stone, has a triangular cresting at its roof edge.
1016 Main (1899) and 1020 Main (1899). Two identical one-story, cut stone buildings.
7022 Main (1900). Two-story cut stone building which originally had a small second-story balcony.

References

Historic districts on the National Register of Historic Places in South Dakota
National Register of Historic Places in Meade County, South Dakota